Lipowo  is a village in the administrative district of Gmina Sztabin, within Augustów County, Podlaskie Voivodeship, in northeastern Poland.

References

Lipowo